Robilliard may refer to:

People with the family name
David Robilliard (1952–1988), British contemporary artist from Guernsey.
Kylie Robilliard (born 1988), British athlete from Guernsey.

Place
Robilliard Glacier on the Usarp Mountains in Antarctica.